Mordellistena menoko is a species of beetle in the genus Mordellistena of the family Mordellidae. It was discovered in 1932.

References

menoko